Bill Haley is a former Wyoming state legislator. A member of the Republican Party, Haley represented the 46th district in the Wyoming House of Representatives from 2017 to 2021.

Elections

2016
When incumbent Republican Representative Glenn Moniz announced his retirement in order to run for the Wyoming Senate, Haley announced his candidacy. Haley ran unopposed in the Republican primary and defeated Democratic candidate Ken Chestek with 58% of the vote.

References

External links
Profile from Ballotpedia
Bill Haley for Wyoming House official campaign website

Republican Party members of the Wyoming House of Representatives
People from Albany County, Wyoming
Living people
Year of birth missing (living people)
21st-century American politicians